Kadma (referred to in census records as Kadma II) is a census town in the Katkamdag CD block in the Hazaribagh Sadar subdivision of  the Hazaribagh district in the Indian state of Jharkhand.

Geography

Location                          

Demographics
According to the 2011 Census of India, Kadma (location code 368710) had a total population of 7,239, of which 3,778 (52%) were males and 3,461 (48%) were females. Population in the age range 0–6 years was 947. The total number of literate persons in Kadma was 5,449 (86.60% of the population over 6 years).

Infrastructure
According to the District Census Handbook 2011, Hazaribagh, Kadma No. II covered an area of 2.34 km2. Among the civic amenities, it had 8 km roads with both open and covered drains, the protected water supply involved uncovered well, hand pump. It had 1,202 domestic electric connections. Among the educational facilities it had 4 primary schools, 3 middle schools, other educational facilities at Hazaribagh 5 km away.

Transport
Hazaribagh Town railway station on the Koderma–Hazaribagh–Barkakana–Ranchi line is located nearby.

References

Cities and towns in Hazaribagh district